San Pietro in Gessate is a church in Milan, northern Italy. Built in the 15th century, it is a noteworthy example of Gothic architecture.

Description
The architect was either Guiniforte Solari or his son Pietro Antonio. The church has a nave and two aisles, with square-plan, groin vaulted spans, flanked by two rows of chapels. Instead of the traditional Gothic piers, the naves are separated by Corinthian columns in granite, the sole indication in the church of the contemporary humanist revolution started in Florence by Brunelleschi and others.

San Pietro in Gessate is home to a series of paintings of the Renaissance in Lombardy. Artists who worked here include Giovanni Donato Montorfano, Bernardino Butinone and Bernardo Zenale. The latter responsible for the impressive Histories of St.Ambrose in the Grifi Chapel. The chapel has a notable tombstone statue of Ambrogio Grifi by Benedetto Briosco. In the early 16th century Vincenzo Foppa completed for this church his famous Deposition, which later acquired by the Museum of Berlin and lost during World War II. From 1514 is a fresco by Ambrogio Bergognone portraying the Funeral of St Martin.

References

16th-century Roman Catholic church buildings in Italy
Roman Catholic churches in Milan
Gothic architecture in Milan
Renaissance architecture in Milan
Tourist attractions in Milan